Akinwale Joseph Odimayo (born 28 November 1999) is an English professional footballer who plays as a defender for Northampton Town.

Career
Odimayo began his career with Reading, turning professional in July 2018, and making his senior debut for the club on 27 August 2019 in the EFL Cup. He moved on loan to Hungerford Town in September 2019, and on loan to Irish club Waterford in February 2020.

After being released by Reading at the end of the 2019–20 season, he signed for Swindon Town in August 2020. On 14 May 2021 it was announced that he had been offered a new contract. Odimayo went on trial with League One club Portsmouth but failed to earn an contract. On 3 August 2021 Odimayo signed a new one-year contract with Swindon Town.

He signed for Northampton Town in July 2022.

Personal life
Born in England, Odimayo is of Nigerian descent.

Career statistics

Honours
Individual
Swindon Town Supporters' Player of the Year: 2020–21

References

1999 births
Living people
English footballers
English people of Nigerian descent
Association football defenders
Reading F.C. players
Hungerford Town F.C. players
Waterford F.C. players
Swindon Town F.C. players
National League (English football) players
League of Ireland players
English Football League players
Black British sportspeople
Northampton Town F.C. players